Lazarakis Kekhagias (born 27 May 1961) is a Greek alpine skier. He competed in two events at the 1980 Winter Olympics.

References

1961 births
Living people
Greek male alpine skiers
Olympic alpine skiers of Greece
Alpine skiers at the 1980 Winter Olympics
Place of birth missing (living people)